United Nations Security Council Resolution 2, adopted on January 30, 1946, encouraged Iran and the Soviet Union to resolve their conflict concerning Soviet troops occupying Iranian territory. The Security Council requested to be updated on negotiations between the two sides at any time.

The resolution was adopted unanimously.

Background 
The source of the conflict dates back to 1942 when Iran signed an agreement allowing the entry of British and Soviet troops into the country for the defense of the oil field in case of a potential German attack. Following the signing of the agreement American troops also entered the country. The 1942 treaty contained a specific provision that required all foreign troops to exit Iran within six months dated from the end of the war. However, the United Kingdom and the United States began pressuring Iran for oil concessions and similar action by the Soviets followed.

The election of Harry S. Truman introduced a more hostile American foreign policy toward the Soviet Union which remained in Iran. The country became a testing ground for the new 'toughness' policy employed by the United States to contain the spread of Soviet influence. In return, Moscow began supporting rebels fighting to overthrow the Iranian government to protect its sphere of influence in the region. The United States brought the matter to the United Nations in a form of a formal complaint which marked the beginning of the crisis.

The aftermath 
The deadline for the withdrawal of foreign troops ended on March 2, 1946, but Soviet troops remained in Iran. The troops left the country on March 25, 1946, after the Soviet Union and Iran reached an agreement. In exchange for the withdrawal of troops Iran gave Moscow oil concessions.

See also
 Azerbaijan People's Government
 List of United Nations Security Council Resolutions 1 to 100 (1946–1953)
 Republic of Mahabad

References

 Text of the Resolution at undocs.org
 Soviets announce withdrawal from Iran
 The Iranian Crisis of 1945-46 and the Cold War

External links
 

 0002
1946 in Iran
1946 in the Soviet Union
Iran–Soviet Union relations
Iran–Soviet Union border
 0002
 0002
January 1946 events